Space Jam: Music from and Inspired by the Motion Picture is the original soundtrack album of the 1996 film starring Michael Jordan and the Looney Tunes cast. An album featuring the film's score by James Newton Howard was also released. The soundtrack was released by Warner Sunset and Atlantic Records on October 29, 1996. "I Believe I Can Fly" by R. Kelly was first released on the soundtrack.

Reception 

The soundtrack peaked at No. 2 on the US Billboard 200 on the week ending April 5, 1997 behind Aerosmith's Nine Lives. It was certified double platinum in January 1997. In 2001, the soundtrack was certified 6x Platinum.

Track listing 

(*) Does not appear in the film

Album singles

Charts

Weekly charts

Year-end charts

Decade-end charts

Certifications

References 

Hip hop soundtracks
Basketball music
1996 soundtrack albums
1990s film soundtrack albums
Atlantic Records soundtracks
Space Jam
Comedy film soundtracks